Kottoor Church or Kottoor St. George Orthodox Syrian Church is an ancient chapel of Kolenchery Church. It is situated 0.5 km south of Kolenchery town, towards Karukappilly road and Muvattupuzha river. This Church is considered as the oldest of all structures founded in Kerala, India after Saint George. Kottoor church is believed to be the second oldest Christian structure constructed in Ernakulam District after Kottakavu Church at Paravoor.

The Kottoor Church is believed to be founded in 5th century AD as a chapel of Pallippuram Church near Cherthala in the initial periods. From there, it was transferred as a chapel of Piravom Church at its establishment. In the 9th Century AD, when the famous Kadamattom Church was established nearby, Kottoor Church became its chapel. At last, when the Kolenchery Church was constructed in the 6th Century AD, Kottoor Church became its part as a chapel. The church is governed according to the 1934 constitution of Malankara Orthodox Syrian Church, and is part of the Kandanad West diocese of the church. A metropolitan conducted Holy mass in the Kottoor church after a long gap of 90 years on 23 July 2017, after a recent (3 July 2017) verdict of Honourable Supreme court of India, ending the dispute that lasted past 100 years in the parent Kolenchery church.

Recent history of Kottoor Pally 

During the days of Marthoma Church-Orthodox split tensions in the 19th century, Kottoor Pally stood as a strong hold of the Orthodox Christians in the Kolenchery area. At that time, the parish church at Kolenchery was in the occupation of Marthoma faction.

After the tensions with Marthoma Church got over, Catholicos Baselios Paulose I took charge of reconstruction of Kottoor Church. Many important religious leaders like Pulikkottil Joseph Mar Dionysious II, Yuyakim Mar Koorilos, Mar Oudisho of Chaldean Syrian Church also had connections with Kottoor Church.

Other Kottoors

Kottoor is a well known Hindu family name in Kidangayam ward at  village Nooranad in Alappuzha District. This family's contribution to  the traditional Ayurveda treatment and social work is significant.  The new generation from the family consists of known social activists, poetress, highly successful professionals, senior Government officers, and business people.
  
Kottoor is in the vicinity of Vadakadathukavu Temple which has an inheritance  with the "Pazoor mana".

 Knanaya Christian family, in Kottayam District.

References
 Official website of St. Peter's and St. Paul's Orthodox Church, Kolenchery

Churches in Ernakulam district
Malankara Orthodox Syrian church buildings